ACM Fellowship is an award and fellowship that recognises outstanding members of the Association for Computing Machinery (ACM). The title of ACM Fellow indicates excellence, as evinced by technical, professional and leadership contributions that:

 advance computing
 promote the free exchange of ideas 
 advance the objectives of ACM

At most 1% of the ACM membership may be elected as Fellows. 

New fellows are elected annually since 1993.

See also
 Fellows of the ACM (by year)
 Fellows of the ACM (category)

References